The Luenger Beta 1 was an American high-wing, single-seat, T-tailed FAI Open Class glider designed by Hans Luenger and Spud Kohler.

Design and development
The Beta was intended to become America's first production fiberglass sailplane. The design work was done by Luenger and Kohler in 1967 in Cleveland, Ohio. When the fuselage was completed a Federal Aviation Administration inspector informed the pair that the aircraft would not qualify to be sold as an amateur-built kit and that the design would require type certification. At that time this would have required an investment of US$250,000 and as a result Kohler withdrew from the project, leaving Luenger to complete the prototype. The prototype was registered as an amateur-built in 1972, but no further aircraft were completed.

The Beta 1 was constructed predominantly from fiberglass, with the wing covered in plywood with a  layer of fiberglass cloth and resin over that. The wing featured terminal velocity Schempp-Hirth style dive brakes and a Wortmann FX 61-184 airfoil becoming an FX 61-160 at the tip. The fuselage was a pod-and-boom design, with fully reclined pilot seating, a fixed monowheel landing gear and T-tail.

Soaring Magazine reported in 1983 that the sole Beta 1 had been donated to the National Soaring Museum along with all its tooling, but as of May 2011 it was not listed in their collection. The aircraft's registration with the FAA was cancelled in April 2011 and it is currently displayed in the Wings Over the Rockies Air and Space Museum.

Specifications (Beta)

See also

References

External links
Photo of the Luenger Beta 1 in the Wings Over the Rockies Air and Space Museum on 9 April 2011

1970s United States sailplanes
Aircraft first flown in 1972
T-tail aircraft
High-wing aircraft